Caxarias is a civil parish and a village in the municipality of Ourém, Portugal. The population in 2011 was 2,166, in an area of 18.03 km².

References

Freguesias of Ourém